Erris Head (Irish: Ceann Iorrais) is a promontory at the northernmost tip of the Mullet Peninsula, located in the barony of Erris in northwest County Mayo, Ireland. It is a well known and recognised landmark used by mariners and weather forecasters, and is also a scenic viewpoint, with an unobstructed view of the Atlantic Ocean and steep rocky cliffs. It is not served by any road and can only be reached by crossing a number of fields.

Special Area of Conservation
Erris Head has been designated a Special Area of Conservation (SAC) under the European Union's Habitats Directive.

This dry heath supports juniper, bearberry, crowberry and heather. There are wet flushes and areas of wet heath, and here grow blunt-flowered rush, three species of sundew and the rare marsh heleborine orchid.

Seabirds nest on the cliffs, with fulmars and great black-backed gulls being most numerous, and peregrine falcons and choughs also breed here. In winter, barnacle geese feed on the grasslands above the cliff. Irish hares and common frogs occur on the headland, and grey seals can often be seen at the foot of the cliffs.

Marine reserve

See also
 Wild Atlantic Way

References

Special Areas of Conservation in the Republic of Ireland
Headlands of County Mayo
Marine reserves of the Republic of Ireland
Protected areas of County Mayo
Gaeltacht places in County Mayo
Erris